Mark Anthony Barriga (born 11 June 1993) is a Filipino professional boxer who challenged for the IBF mini-flyweight title in 2018. As an amateur, Barriaga represented Philippines at the 2012 Olympics, reaching the round of 16 of the light-flyweight bracket.

Personal life
Barriga was born in Danao, Cebu but grew up in Panabo, Davao del Norte. Mark Anthony was born to Edgar and Melita Barriga, the former a printing machine operator for a Korean company in their hometown. Barriga took up boxing at the age of 10, encouraged by his father. He studied business at the UM Panabo College and plays guitar as a hobby.

Amateur career
Barriga's participation at the 2012 London Olympics ended after he lost  to Kazakh boxer Birzhan Zhakypov, 16–17, in their August 4 round-of-16 match. Barriga was slapped with a one-point deduction in the middle of the fight's third and final round, enabling Zhakypov to eke out a one-point win despite trailing by two (8–10) after the second round.

2011 World Amateur results

Defeated Stefan Caslarov (Romania) 12–5
Defeated Paddy Barnes (Ireland) 20–12
Lost to Zou Shiming (China) 5–12

2012 Olympic results

Defeated Manuel Cappai (Italy) 17–7
Lost to Birzhan Zhakypov (Kazakhstan) 16–17

2013 Southeast Asian Games 

Defeated Huynu Ngoc Tan (Vietnam) 2–1
Defeated Mohd Fuad Mohd Reuvan (Malaysia) 2–1
Defeated Konelis Kwangu Langu (Indonesia) 3–0

World Series of Boxing

2013–2014 Season boxing fighting for Italia Thunder
 Defeated Leandro Blanc  (Argentina) of Argentina Condors (3–0)
 Defeated Ovidiu Berceanu  (Romania) of Team Germany by points (3–0)
 Defeated Lü Bin (China) of USA Knockouts by points (3–0)
 Defeated  Ovidiu Berceanu  (Romania) of Team Germany by points (3–0)
 Lost to  Khamza Nametov  (Russia) of Azerbaijan Baku Fires due to TKO-Injury

Professional career
He decided to turn pro after Rogen Ladon qualified for the 2016 Summer Olympics as a flyweight, which was Barriga's weight class. Barriga was set to become a professional boxer on June 18, 2016 against Mark Anthony Florida at the Philippine Navy Gym in Taguig in the mini-flyweight division but this match was later cancelled. Upon turning pro, Barriga signed to manager Jason Soong and was trained by Joven Jimenez.

A new debut match was scheduled and Barriga was pitted against 18-year old Melvin Manangquil in an undercard match in a show organized by Cebu City-based promotion OPSI at the Robinsons Galleria in Cebu in July 2016. Barriga's match with Manangquil was fought in six rounds instead of four which is customary for debuts of novices in the mini-flyweight division. Barriga won by unanimous decision (60–54, 59–55, 59–55) Barriga's third fight was stopped in the fifth round of eight scheduled, after Barriga was cut by an accidental headbutt. He won the fight by technical decision. Barriga got his first stoppage win in his fifth fight, scoring a round 2 technical knockout over Marlou Sandoval. On September 9, 2017, Barriga defeated former world title challenger Samartlek Kokietgym, out boxing him en route to a wide unanimous decision win (100–90, 100–90, 100–90). Barriga won the WBO International mini-flyweight title in this fight. In May 2018, Barriga defeated Gabriel Mendoza, another former world title challenger, by unanimous decision. With the win, Barriga improved his record to nine wins and zero losses and became the IBF's mandatory challenger. This was Barriga's first twelve-round fight.

Barriga called out the IBF mini-flyweight world champion, Hiroto Kyoguchi, but Kyoguchi moved up a weight class to light flyweight shortly thereafter. The IBF ordered a match between Barriga and Carlos Licona for the vacant title. After negotiations stalled for a few months, the fight was agreed for the undercard of Deontay Wilder vs. Tyson Fury.

Professional boxing record

References

External links
 
 Mark Anthony Barriga on London 2012
 Profile in AIBA INTERNATIONAL BOXING ASSOCIATION

1993 births
Living people
Boxers from Davao del Norte
Boxers at the 2012 Summer Olympics
Light-flyweight boxers
Olympic boxers of the Philippines
Asian Games medalists in boxing
Boxers at the 2014 Asian Games
Filipino male boxers
Asian Games bronze medalists for the Philippines
Medalists at the 2014 Asian Games
Southeast Asian Games medalists in boxing
Southeast Asian Games gold medalists for the Philippines
Southeast Asian Games competitors for the Philippines
Competitors at the 2013 Southeast Asian Games